Kajang or Kadjang is a district in Bulukumba Regency, South Sulawesi, Indonesia. According to the 2010 census, the population is 46,983. Many of the indigenous people retain a pre-Islamic belief system.

References

Districts of South Sulawesi
Populated places in South Sulawesi